The Conference Center, in Salt Lake City, Utah, is the premier meeting hall for the Church of Jesus Christ of Latter-day Saints (LDS Church). Completed in 2000, the 21,000-seat Conference Center replaced the traditional use of the nearby Salt Lake Tabernacle, built in 1868, for the church's biannual general conference and other major gatherings, devotionals, and events.  It is believed to be the largest theater-style auditorium ever built.

Features 

The 1.4 million square foot (130,000 m2) Conference Center seats 21,200 people in its main auditorium. This includes the rostrum behind the pulpit facing the audience, which provides seating at general conference for general authorities and general officers of the church and the 360-voice Tabernacle Choir at Temple Square. The auditorium is large enough to hold a Boeing 747 in the space between the seats and the rear of the stage. All seats in the audience have an unobstructed view of the pulpit because the roof is held up by radial trusses. The balcony is supported by a series of 34 cantilevers. This construction method allows the balcony to sink  under full capacity. Behind the podium is a 7,708-pipe and 130-rank Schoenstein pipe organ. Underground is a parking garage that can hold 1,400 cars. A modernist, three-story chandelier hangs in a skylight in the interior of the building. A waterfall descends from the spire. City Creek flows in a rough-hewn riverbed, complementing the Conference Center.

On the third floor of the Conference Center there are busts of current and past church presidents and photographs of church leaders; photographs of female church leaders were added in 2014.

Because the building sits near the base of Salt Lake City's Capitol Hill, the roof is landscaped for attractiveness, an extension of the Gardens at Temple Square. About 3 acres (12,000 m2) of grass and hundreds of trees have been planted on the roof. Twenty-one native grasses were employed to conserve water and showcase local foliage. The rooftop garden includes a central garden of rectangular planters of aspen and conifers with long runnels and basins of water. The landscaping is meant to echo the mountains and meadows of Utah.

Conference Center Theater 

Attached to the main building on the northwest corner is the 900-seat Conference Center Theater that can be used as a dedicated theater or as an overflow room.

Planning and construction 
The design of the Conference Center was accomplished by Portland, Oregon-based Zimmer Gunsul Frasca Partnership. Auerbach & Associates of San Francisco was responsible for theater design and architectural lighting.  The designs were solicited by church architect Leland A. Gray in the early 1990s, in conjunction with Gordon B. Hinckley who then became church president in 1995. The LDS Church originally sought a 26,000-seat building no more than 75 feet (23 m) high in accord with zoning regulations for the church-owned 10 acre (40,000 m2) block immediately north of Temple Square. Hinckley publicly announced the project in the April 1996 general conference. The final plans, completed in late 1996, featured 21,200 seats in the main hall, with 905 in the side theater.

Contracting for the building was done by Jacobsen, Layton, and Okland—three Salt Lake City construction firms. The three companies submitted a joint bid in order to compete with national firms. The companies jointly operated under the name "Legacy Constructors" after winning the contract in late 1996.

Demolition of existing LDS Church properties on the site began May 1997. Deseret Gym—a YMCA-like gymnasium—and the Mormon Handicraft store had to be razed for the project.

Ground was broken July 24, 1997. This date coincided with the 150th anniversary of Mormon pioneers entering the Salt Lake Valley, an event celebrated in Utah as Pioneer Day.

Little Cottonwood Canyon controversy 

Although the Conference Center is a modern steel truss and rebar-based design without need for masonry support, the LDS Church sought slabs of quartz monzonite, a form of granite, to clad all exterior walls. Specifically, the church wanted granite to match rock quarried more than a hundred years earlier to build the adjacent Salt Lake Temple. Therefore, the church requested a permit to quarry granite from Little Cottonwood Canyon southeast of Salt Lake City. The Salt Lake County Commission granted a two-year permit on condition that extraction not interfere with the ski season. Critics of the extraction argued that the quarry harmed the environment and burdened residents while endangering drivers through Little Cottonwood Canyon below.

Quarrying began May 28, 1998. The quarry location was further up the canyon from where stone was extracted for the Salt Lake Temple. Although court filings challenged the legality of extracting the granite (specifically attacking Salt Lake County's authority to issue permit), the project was interrupted only by winter weather. The church finished quarrying by November 1999. Over 300,000 square feet (28,000 m2) of granite was extracted. The granite was subsequently cut into slabs at a facility in Idaho Falls and used for the facade of the building.  There was not enough granite extracted from the Little Cottonwood Canyon quarry for the entire project, so extra granite was brought in from the mid-west and used for the flooring.

Completion 
The Salt Lake City Tornado hindered construction on August 11, 1999. Construction cranes toppled at the work site, and four injuries to crew were reported. Otherwise, construction proceeded smoothly and rapidly.

Construction was complete enough for the building to be used for the 170th annual general conference on April 1 and 2, 2000. The pipe organ was not yet operational, so the Mormon Tabernacle Choir was accompanied by a synthesized organ amplified through the center's speaker system.  Hinckley remarked in his opening address that over 370,000 people had inquired about tickets for the center's inaugural general conference. He also related that a black walnut tree that he had planted decades earlier in his backyard provided wood for the pulpit of the new center.

The Conference Center was dedicated six months later, on October 8, during the 170th semiannual general conference. As part of the event, the dedicatory prayer was followed by a "hosanna shout"—a show of gratitude that dates to the early days of the Latter Day Saint movement. The shout involves participants waving white handkerchiefs while repeating "Hosanna, hosanna, hosanna, to God and the Lamb" three times. Though it had been used in public before, such as during the capstone ceremony for the Salt Lake Temple and at the church centennial celebration in 1930, before this public broadcast of the hosanna shout, some assumed it was exclusively related to temple dedications, which are not accessible to non-Latter-day Saints. The Conference Center dedication demonstrated that the hosanna shout, although considered sacred by the Latter-day Saints, is not necessarily used exclusively in temple-related settings.

Schoenstein Organ at the Conference Center 

This organ is internationally significant, both because of its role in accompanying choirs in conferences, and also in that it is the only organ in the world that has 2 registers of pipes extending down into the 64' series, the 64' Contra Trombone and 64' Contra Gamba, which both extend 4 pipes down to GGGGG#, 13 semitones below the lowest note on a standard piano. The tallest pipe used to produce this note is approximately 40 feet (5 stories) tall. This organ also has many other unique features, including full-compass manual 32' reed and flue registers, double expression, and many heroic voices on high pressure. High pressures are used throughout the organ due to the monumental amount of sound needed to project out into an auditorium of this size.

References

Further reading

External links

 The Conference Center Official site
 Utah.gov State Tourism site: Conference Center
 Set in Stone: Architectural Beauties of the Conference Center,  a documentary on the Conference Center from BYU TV
 American Society Landscape Architects 2003 Awards: Conference Center's Green Roof

20th-century Latter Day Saint church buildings
Buildings and structures in Salt Lake City
Event venues established in 2000
Religious buildings and structures in Salt Lake City
Religious buildings and structures of the Church of Jesus Christ of Latter-day Saints in Utah
Religious buildings and structures completed in 2000